The Light at Dusk is a lost 1916 silent film drama directed by Edgar Lewis and produced by the Lubin Manufacturing Company.

Cast
Orrin Johnson - Vladimir Krestovsky/Mr. Krest
Mary Carr - Natasha (*as Mary Kennavan Carr)
Sally Crute - Mrs. Krest
Hedda Kuszewski - Olga
Robert Frazer - Nicholas (*Robert W. Frazer)
Evelyn Terrill - Frances Farrell

References

External links
 The Light at Dusk at IMDb.com

1916 films
American silent feature films
Lost American films
Lubin Manufacturing Company films
American black-and-white films
Silent American drama films
1916 drama films
1916 lost films
Lost drama films
Films directed by Edgar Lewis
1910s American films